Barto may refer to:
 Agniya Barto (1906–1981), Russian poet and children's writer
 Barry Barto (born 1950), American soccer player and coach
 Barto Township, Roseau County, Minnesota
 Barto, Pennsylvania
 Andrew Barto (born 1948), professor of computer science
 Tzimon Barto (born 1963), American pianist
 Barto (band), an electropunk and electroclash band from Saint Petersburg, Russia
 Barto and Mann, a comedic dance act from the late 1920s to the early 1940s
 El Barto, an alter ego of Bart Simpson in The Simpsons